Ratna Park is a park and surrounding district in central Kathmandu, Nepal. It is named after Queen Ratna, the wife of King Mahendra. It was built for the children and is named after Ratna, the second queen of King Mahendra. It is situated between Rani Pokhari and Tudikhel in the heart of Kathmandu.

References

Parks in Nepal
Kathmandu
1964 establishments in Nepal